The Rural Water Supplies and Sewerage Act 1944 (7 & 8 Geo. VI c. 26) was an Act of Parliament in the United Kingdom, introduced by the coalition government.

It empowered the Government to make grants for the purpose of expanding rural water supplies, up to the sum of £15,000,000 in England and Wales and £6,375,000 in Scotland - this sum was extended to £20,000,000 for Scotland by the Water (Scotland) Act 1949.

Implementation
By March 1950 the Government had granted £9,839,000 in England and Wales, and £6,619,000 in Scotland, with £3,700,000 of the latter sum being spent in the Highlands; applications for the remainder of the grants were in process. The limiting factor on expenditure had been the availability of labour and materials, not problems with the provision of finance.

Prior to 1944, while most households in urban areas of England and Wales had a piped water supply, the situation in rural areas was that only 70 per cent had this service. As a result of the provisions of the Act, this had increased to 80 per cent by 1951.

On 18 November 1947, Colin Thornton-Kemsley, the MP for Kincardine and Western Aberdeenshire, asked questions in the House of Commons of Arthur Woodburn, the Secretary of State for Scotland, about the practical outworkings of the Act, as by that time applications for grants in Scotland exceeded the money available by around £25 million. Woodburn responded that he had previously mentioned the possibility of extending the sum available, but that it would require new legislation to do so.

The outworkings of the Act were again raised by Major Simon Ramsay, MP for Forfarshire, on 10 May 1949, when he requested information about how many schemes had benefitted from the Act in Scotland. Woodburn replied that 70 water supply schemes had been started, of which 36 were already completed, and that 68 drainage schemes has been started, of which 44 were complete.
 
The Act was repealed on 1 April 1996 as a result of the passing of the Local Government etc. (Scotland) Act 1994.

Bibliography

References
Facts and Figures for Socialists, 1951. Labour Party Research Department, London, 1950

United Kingdom Acts of Parliament 1944